Josias de Oliveira Ramalho (born 29 August 1937) is a Brazilian former volleyball player who competed in the 1964 Summer Olympics.

References

1937 births
Living people
Brazilian men's volleyball players
Olympic volleyball players of Brazil
Volleyball players at the 1964 Summer Olympics
Volleyball players at the 1963 Pan American Games
Pan American Games gold medalists for Brazil
Place of birth missing (living people)
Pan American Games medalists in volleyball
Medalists at the 1963 Pan American Games